Massey Tower is a new complex in Toronto, Ontario, Canada, being built spanning the block below Shuter Street, between Yonge and Victoria streets.
The Northeast corner of the complex will add much needed backstage space to historic Massey Hall.  To the south of the complex lies the historic Elgin and Winter Garden Theatres.  The Yonge Street facade will use the 1905 Canadian Bank of Commerce headquarters, at 197 Yonge Street, vacant since 1987.  The complex's tower will rise 60 storeys and stand  in height.

The vacant space was once Colonial Tavern and was Yonge Street Theatre Block Park until 2015 when trees were removed. Access to this park was blocked on and off since 2007.

The building's footprint is "S" shaped.  Vehicles will be parked on floors three through eight.

The building's developers are MOD Developments, and the building was designed by Hariri Pontarini Architects. The building is being constructed by Tucker HiRise.

References

Buildings and structures under construction in Canada
Residential skyscrapers in Toronto